The Coastal Stallions is a former Fijian rugby union team.

The Coastal Stallions is a Fijian former rugby union team that had a franchise area coverering Nadroga-Navosa, Namosi, Serua and Malolo. The team played in Fiji's premier rugby union competition the Colonial Cup from 2004 to 2008, winning the champioshup title three times before the competition ceased in 2008.

History
The franchise was one of four original teams created for the inaugural Colonial Cup in 2004. They won the first Colonial Cup 26-21 over Suva Highlanders. They defeated 29-15 Suva Highlanders in a tough encounter in 2006 to clinch their second title.

Club honours
 Colonial Cup winners 2004, 2006, 2007

Coaching team
Coach: Joji Rinakama
Manager: Penaia Naresia
Captain: Apisai Turukawa

References

External links
Coastal Stallions

Defunct Fijian rugby union teams
2007 in Fijian rugby union
2008 in Fijian rugby union
Colonial Cup (rugby union) teams